Colonel Sultani Makenga (born 25 December 1973 in Rutshuru, Zaire) is the military chief of the March 23 Movement, a rebel military group based in eastern areas of the Democratic Republic of the Congo. Makenga is an ethnic Tutsi and was raised in South Kivu. He fought for the Rwandan Patriotic Front during the Rwandan Civil War. 

Sanctions were introduced against him by the United Nations Security Council in November 2012. He has denied accusations that the M23 rebellion is backed by Rwanda. His faction of the M23 have clashed with those loyal to its political leader, Jean-Marie Runiga Lugerero. In May 2013, the M23 rebels clashed with FARDC (Armed Forces of the Democratic Republic of the Congo) and there were rumors that Makenga was badly wounded. 

On November 7, 2013, after the M23 was defeated by the FARDC backed by the UN FIB (Force Intervention Brigade), Makenga surrendered with hundreds of M23 fighters in Mgahinga National Park, Uganda. He and his troops are held in a secret location.

In early 2017, he tried to start again a guerilla war in DRC with 200 men. He failed and some of his militants were even hired by the Ugandan government to crush protests.

See also
Bertrand Bisimwa
Bosco Ntaganda
Jean-Marie Runiga Lugerero

References

Living people
Democratic Republic of the Congo politicians
1973 births
People of the M23 rebellion
People from North Kivu
Warlords
Tutsi people